Beetebuerger Basket Club Nitia or simply Nitia Bettembourg is a Luxembourg professional basketball club from the commune of Bettembourg.

History 
Nitia Bettembourg founded in 1932 by pioneers of the Luxembourgian basketball, and is the first basketball club of the Grand Duchy of Luxembourg and celebrated its 75th anniversary in 2007. BBC Nitia is affiliated with the FLBB (Luxembourg Basketball Federation).

Name through history 
 1932-1933 KJ Beetebuerg (Katholischer Jünglingsverein Bettemburg)
 1934-1941 CSC Nitia Beetebuerg (Cercle Sportif Catholique Nitia)
 1942-1945 Sportverein für Basketball und Fussball Bettemburg
 1945-1955 C.S. Sporting Nitia Beetebuerg (football section, basketball section, etc.) ... and ... Basket-Ball-Club de Bettembourg (BBC))
 1955-1967 Sporting Nitia Beetebuerg ... and ... Basket-Ball-Club de Bettembourg (BBC)
 1967-1968 C.S. Nitia Beetebuerg (Cercle Sportif Nitia) ... and ... Basket-Ball-Club de Bettembourg (BBC)
 1968 to present BBC Nitia (Beetebuerger Basket Club Nitia)

Honours 

Total League
 Winners (16): 1933-34, 1934–35, 1935–36, 1936–37, 1937–38, 1938–39, 1939–40, 1944–45, 1945–46, 1946–47, 1947–48, 1948–49, 1949–50, 1950–51, 1952–53, 1953-54
Luxembourgian Cup
 Winners (3): 1953-54, 1957–58, 1967–68

External links 
 BBC Nitia official site

Basketball teams established in 1932
Basketball teams in Luxembourg